Abyysky District (Abıy uluuha) is an administrative and municipal district (raion, or ulus), one of the thirty-four in the Sakha Republic, Russia. It is located in the north of the republic around the Indigirka River and borders with Allaikhovsky District in the north, Srednekolymsky District in the east, Verkhnekolymsky District in the southeast, Momsky District in the south, and with Ust-Yansky District in the west. Its administrative center is the urban locality (an urban-type settlement) of Belaya Gora. As of the 2010 Census, the total population of the district was 4,425, with the population of Belaya Gora accounting for 50.7% of that number.

Geography
The Indigirka River and its tributary Uyandina, with the Khatyngnakh, are the main watercourses flowing through the district. The Indigirka is navigable and provides a link to the Kolyma Bay on the East Siberian Sea to the north. The Aby Lowland with up to 15,000 lakes, including Lake Ozhogino, the largest and fifth largest lake in the Sakha Republic, as well as Lake Suturuokha, is located in the district.

Climate

History
The district was established on May 25, 1930. Initially, its administrative center was in the selo of Abyy, but on January 10, 1941 it was moved to Druzhina. On October 4, 1974, it was moved again, this time to Belaya Gora.

Administrative and municipal status
Within the framework of administrative divisions, Abyysky District is one of the thirty-four in the republic. It is divided into one settlement (an administrative division with the administrative center in the urban-type settlement (inhabited locality) of Belaya Gora) and five rural okrugs (naslegs), all of which comprise six rural localities. As a municipal division, the district is incorporated as Abyysky Municipal District. The Settlement of Belaya Gora is incorporated into an urban settlement, and the five rural okrugs are incorporated into five rural settlements within the municipal district. The urban-type settlement of Belaya Gora serves as the administrative center of both the administrative and municipal district.

Inhabited localities

Demographics
As of the 2010 Census, the ethnic composition was as follows:
Yakuts: 80.1%
Russians: 8.7%
Evens: 7.9%
Evenks: 1.2%
Ukrainians: 0.5%
others: 1.6%

References

Notes

Sources
Official website of the Sakha Republic. Registry of the Administrative-Territorial Divisions of the Sakha Republic. Abyysky District. 

Districts of the Sakha Republic